Neue Schule Hamburg is a private Sudbury school in Rahlstedt, Hamburg, Germany, established in 2007.

History
The school was founded by Philipp Palm, who was the school's principal, his partner the German popstar Nena Kerner, Silke Steinfadt and Thomas Simmerl in September 2007 in Rahlstedt with 85 pupils and six teachers. It was the first school in Germany to be organised on the Sudbury school concept.  Setting out her rationale for helping establish the school, Nena referred to her own "uninspiring" education, explaining that, "When I was a child, like all children, I had so many ideas and so much curiosity. I wanted to take on the world but the teachers were the ruling force. That doesn't encourage children; it represses them."

During the first year, there were reports of theft and violence at the school. However, after three years, it was recognised by the Hamburg school authority as a state-approved substitute school, and the Hamburg school authority agreed to contribute to the running costs from 2011. In 2010, the school had increased the number of teachers to ten.

References

External links 

 Official web site

Schools in Hamburg
Buildings and structures in Wandsbek
Private schools in Germany
Educational institutions established in 2007
Sudbury Schools
Democratic free schools
2007 establishments in Germany